Homarus is a genus of lobsters, which include the common and commercially significant species Homarus americanus (the American lobster) and Homarus gammarus (the European lobster). The Cape lobster, which was formerly in this genus as H. capensis, was moved in 1995 to the new genus Homarinus.

Description
Homarus is one of three extant genera of clawed lobsters to show dimorphism between claws – a specialisation into a crushing claw and a cutting claw. The other similar genera are Nephrops, which is much more slender, and has grooves along the claws and the abdomen, and Homarinus, the Cape lobster from South Africa, which is even smaller, and has hairy claws.

While analyses of morphology suggest a close relationship between Homarinus and Homarus, molecular analyses using mitochondrial DNA reveal that they are not sister taxa. Both genera lack ornamentation such as spines and carinae, but are thought to have reached that state independently, through convergent evolution. The closest living relative of Homarus is Nephrops norvegicus, while the closest relatives of Homarinus are Thymops and Thymopides.

Species
Eight extinct species are known from the fossil record, which stretches back to the Cretaceous, but only two species survive. These two species, the American lobster and the European lobster, are very similar and may have speciated as recently as the Pleistocene, during climatic fluctuations. The best characters for distinguishing them are the geographic distribution, with the American lobster in the western Atlantic and the European lobster in the eastern Atlantic, and by the presence of one or more teeth on the underside of the rostrum in H. americanus but not in H. gammarus.

Fossil species

The boundaries between Homarus and the extinct genus Hoploparia are unclear, and some species, such as Hoploparia benedeni have been transferred between the two genera. Eight species have been assigned to Homarus from the fossil record. They are:
Homarus brittonestris Stenzel, 1945 – lower Turonian
Homarus davisi Stenzel, 1945 – lower Turonian
Homarus hakelensis (Fraas, 1878) – Cenomanian
Homarus lehmanni Haas, 1889 – Rupelian
Homarus mickelsoni (Bishop, 1985) – lower Campanian
Homarus morrisi Quayle, 1987 – Eocene
Homarus neptunianus Polkowsky, 2004 – Oligocene
Homarus travisensis Stenzel, 1945 – middle Albian

Distribution
The two extant species of Homarus are both found in the North Atlantic Ocean. H. americanus is found from Labrador to North Carolina in the western North Atlantic, while H. gammarus is found from Arctic Norway to Morocco, including the British Isles and the Mediterranean Sea.

Life cycle

Mating in Homarus is complex and is accompanied by a number of courtship behaviours. Males build mating shelters or burrows, and larger males can attract more females, producing a polygynous mating system. A few days before moulting, a female will choose a mate, and will remain in his shelter until the moult. The male will then insert a spermatophore into the female's seminal vesicle, where it may be stored for several years. The eggs of Homarus species are laid in the autumn, being fertilised externally as they exit, and are carried by the female on her pleopods.

The eggs generally hatch in the spring as a pre-larva, which rapidly develops into the first larval phase. This is followed by three zoeal phases, the total duration of which can vary from two weeks to two months, depending on the temperature. At the following moult, the young animal becomes a post-larva, with a gross form resembling the adult lobster. Although it can swim, using its pleopods, the post-larva soon settles to the bottom and lives as a juvenile for 3–5 years.

As adults, Homarus species moult increasingly infrequently. In H. gammarus, the size at sexual maturity is less well defined, but is in the range .

Notes

References

Bibliography

External links

True lobsters
Crustaceans of the Atlantic Ocean
Extant Albian first appearances